A riverscape (also called river landscape) comprises the features of the landscape which can be found on and along a river. Most features of riverscapes include natural landforms (such as meanders and oxbow lakes) but they can also include artificial landforms (such as man-made levees and river groynes). Riverscapes can be divided into upper course riverscapes, middle course riverscapes, and lower course riverscapes.

The term riverine is sometimes used to indicate the same type of landscape as a riverscape, or only the riverbank. Riverine landscapes may also be defined as a network of rivers and their surrounding land, which is excellent for agricultural use because of the rich and fertile soil. The word riverine is also used as an adjective which means "relating to or found on a river or the banks of a river".

Upper course

In the upper course of rivers, channels are narrow and gradients are steep. Vertical erosion is the prominent land-forming process. Typical features of upper course riverscapes include:
 Interlocking spurs
 Braided channels
 V-shaped valleys
 Giant's kettles
 Plunge pools
 Alluvial fans
 Tributaries
 Waterfalls
 Potholes
 Gorges
 Rapids

Middle course

In the middle course of rivers, the discharge increases and the gradient flattens out. Typical features of middle course riverscapes include:
 U-shaped valleys
 Riparian forests
 Slip-off slopes
 Oxbow lakes
 Tributaries
 Cut banks
 Meanders
 Marshes
 Riffles
 Pools

Lower course

In the lower course of rivers, the channels are wide and deep, and the discharge is at its highest. Typical features of lower course riverscapes include:
 Wide flat-bottomed valleys
 River groynes
 Large bridges
 Distributaries
 River deltas
 Floodplains
 Meanders
 Levees
 Kolks

Landscape art
Riverscapes are popular subjects in landscape paintings. In addition to the use of the word riverscape in geography, the term is also associated with landscape art. In visual arts the term 'river scene' is considered a synonym for the word 'riverscape'. Related terms used in visual arts include 'seascape', 'cloudscape' and 'cityscape'. A well-known riverscape painter was Salomon van Ruysdael. Below are some examples of riverscape paintings.

Photo gallery

See also
 Fluvial processes
 River morphology
 River reclamation
 Riparian buffer
 Riparian zone
 Fresh water
 Canal

References

Rivers
Fluvial landforms
Water and the environment
Geomorphology
Geography